Pennock Island is located in the U.S. state of Alaska near the city of Ketchikan. The island is situated within the Ketchikan Gateway Borough and is part of the Alexander Archipelago. Most of the island is public land managed by the Tongass National Forest.

Geography
Pennock Island lies between Gravina Island and Revillagigedo Island at the eastern end of Tongass Narrows, dividing the waterway into its East and West Channels. It is rather low and wooded; its south shore is steep. East Clump islet is situated off the island's west end. Peninsula Point, which is west of Pennock, is the eastern entrance point to Ward Cove. The village of Pennock is located near Whiskey Cove, across from the Coast Guard Station Ketchikan. 
A few houses are tucked within the thick wooded forest; there is minimal human habitation.

History
It was named for the prospector Homer Pennock, around 1895 by Captain W.E. George, a local pilot. The ancestral tribal burial ground of the Taan ta Kwaan (Tongass people) and the Sanyaa Kwáan (Cape Fox people) are located on Pennock Island. The island is set in Tongass Narrows, which became the subject of national controversy over the Gravina Island Bridge proposal, criticized as the "bridge to nowhere".

Demographics

Pennock Island first appeared on the 1940 U.S. Census as an unincorporated settlement. It did not appear again until 1970. It was made a census-designated place (CDP) in 1980, but was dissolved in 1990 and has not appeared on the census separately since.

Sports event
Pennock Island is the venue for the annual "Pennock Island Challenge" swim race which was started in 2004. The event is held to raise funds for the JDRF. Events consist of solo race, relay race, wet suit and non-wet suit teams. Escort boats and kayak escorts are essential. The 2013 event was held on 4 August. The winner of the race is awarded a certificate recording the time and place and also awarded a medal.

See also
 Cape Fox Village

References

Bibliography

External links

Islands of the Alexander Archipelago
Islands of Ketchikan Gateway Borough, Alaska
Tongass National Forest
Islands of Alaska